The Eswatini women's national volleyball team represents Eswatini in international women's volleyball competitions and friendly matches.

Their head coach is Thulani Maphosa, supported by Wandile Sithole and Mbuso Vilakati.

References

External links
Eswatini National Volleyball Association (ENVA) 

National women's volleyball teams
Volleyball
Volleyball in Eswatini
Women's sport in Eswatini